Martin Dudáš (born March 17, 1987) is a Czech professional ice hockey defenceman. He is playing for HC Košice in the Slovak Extraliga during the 2016-2017 season.

References

External links

1987 births
Living people
BK Mladá Boleslav players
Czech ice hockey defencemen
Sportspeople from Ostrava
MKS Cracovia (ice hockey) players
Expatriate ice hockey players in Poland
Czech expatriate sportspeople in Poland
Czech expatriate ice hockey players in Slovakia
Expatriate ice hockey players in Latvia
HK Dukla Trenčín players
HC Košice players
Czech expatriate sportspeople in Latvia